Coleophora genviki is a moth of the family Coleophoridae. It is found in southern Russia.

References

External links

genviki
Moths described in 2002
Endemic fauna of Russia
Moths of Europe